Untitled (2004) is a work by graffiti artist Banksy. In 2007, it sold for £33,600.

References

Works by Banksy